The Biržai Forest is a primaeval forest in Biržai District Municipality, Lithuania. With the area of 16,770 hectares, it is the tenth largest forest in terms of area in Lithuania.

See also
Biržai Regional Park

References

Forests of Lithuania
Biržai District Municipality
Old-growth forests